The Three Lakes Patrol Cabin was built in 1934 in Mount Rainier National Park as a district ranger station. The log cabin was built to a standard plan designed by W.G. Carnes, Acting Chief Architect of the National Park Service Branch of Plans and Designs, supervised by Thomas Chalmers Vint. It is a simple gable structure with a shed roof over the front door, supported by brackets. The eaves have a similar bracket detail. Log ends project prominently at the corners. It consists of a single room, unfinished apart from a wood floor.

The cabin was placed on the National Register of Historic Places on March 13, 1991.

References

Park buildings and structures on the National Register of Historic Places in Washington (state)
Government buildings completed in 1934
Buildings and structures in Lewis County, Washington
Ranger stations in Mount Rainier National Park
Log cabins in the United States
National Register of Historic Places in Lewis County, Washington
Log buildings and structures on the National Register of Historic Places in Washington (state)
1934 establishments in Washington (state)